Qaleh Kuh Khosrow (also Romanized as Qal‘eh Kūh Khosrow) is a village in Posht Tang Rural District, in the Central District of Sarpol-e Zahab County, Kermanshah Province, Iran. At the 2006 census, its population was 85, in 12 families.

References 

Populated places in Sarpol-e Zahab County